The 1981 Paris–Nice was the 39th edition of the Paris–Nice cycle race and was held from 11 March to 18 March 1981. The race started in Meaux and finished at the Col d'Èze. The race was won by Stephen Roche of the Peugeot team.

Route

General classification

References

Further reading

1981
1981 in road cycling
1981 in French sport
March 1981 sports events in Europe
1981 Super Prestige Pernod